Justice Hansen (born 7 January 1995) is an American football quarterback and currently free agent. He played for the Panthers Wrocław.

Early years
Hansen attended the Edmond Santa Fe High School in Edmond, Oklahoma. He committed to the University of Oklahoma to play college football.

College career
Hansen redshirted his only season at Oklahoma in 2014.

In 2015, as a redshirt freshman, he transferred to Butler Community College. In his only year at Butler he played in nine games, completing 163 of 211 passes for 1,694 yards and 12 touchdowns. After the 2015 season, Hansen transferred to Arkansas State University.

In 2016, as a redshirt sophomore, he began his career at Arkansas State.  He began as the backup to starting quarterback Chad Voytik, but later took over as the starter after the first game of the season and completed 197 of 340 passes for 2,719 yards with 19 touchdowns and eight interceptions.

In 2017, as a redshirt junior, he completed 305 of 487 passes for 3,967 yards, 37 touchdowns and 16 interceptions.

In 2018, as a redshirt senior, he led Arkansas State to an 8-5 record and was named the Sun Belt Player of the Year.

Professional career
In May 2019, after going undrafted in the 2019 NFL Draft he attended the Los Angeles Chargers 2019 rookie minicamp but was never offered a contract.

Saskatchewan Roughriders
On December 23, 2019, he signed with the Saskatchewan Roughriders of the Canadian Football League (CFL). He was released on February 19, 2021.

Panthers Wrocław
In November 2021, he was signed by Panthers Wrocław of the European League of Football (ELF) for the 2022 season.

References

External links
Arkansas State Red Wolves bio

Living people
Sportspeople from Edmond, Oklahoma
Players of American football from Oklahoma
American football quarterbacks
Oklahoma Sooners football players
Butler Grizzlies football players
Arkansas State Red Wolves football players
Saskatchewan Roughriders players
1995 births
American expatriate players of American football
American expatriate sportspeople in Poland
Panthers Wrocław players